Mark W. Allen (August 23, 1877 – October 12, 1958) was an American lumber dealer and politician.

Early life and education
Allen was born on August 23, 1877 in Fairfax County, Virginia, the son of Thomas Douglass Allen and Mary Elizabeth Williams.

Allen attended the Trinity Methodist Episcopal Church in West New Brighton, and founded the popular Trinity Men's Bible Class. He was a member of the Freemasons, the Royal Arch Masons, the Knights Templar, the Scottish Rite, the Shriners, the Odd Fellows, the Junior Order of United American Mechanics, and the Knights of Pythias. In 1907, he married Bessie E. Vorhees of Belford, New Jersey. Their children were Ida M., Doris V., Bessie Betty Elizabeth, George F., and Mark Jr. Bessie died in 1936. Allen then married Julia Maud Smiles of Port Richmond in 1937. Julia died in 1945. Allen then married his third wife, Lila A. Zorn of West New Brighton.

Career
Allen moved to Staten Island, New York in 1898 and began working as a carpenter for the Baltimore and Ohio Railroad. In 1902, he was promoted to superintendent of carpenters. In 1906, he entered the lumber business, and he and his brother George started the Allen Brothers Lumber Company. The firm later merged with another firm and became the Allen-Wheeler Lumber Company, with Allen as its president. In 1935, the firm became the Mark W. Allen Lumber Company. The company sold building supplies, erected buildings, and developed real estate. He was also president of the Staten Island Chamber of Commerce, the Port Richmond Board of Trade, and the West New Brighton Board of Trade, and was a member of the local school board.

In 1922, Allen was elected to the New York State Senate as a Democrat, representing New York's 24th State Senate district (Richmond and Rockland Counties). He served in the Senate in 1923 and 1924. While in the Senate, he helped get three Staten Island bridges built: the Kill Van Kull Bridge, the Goethals Bridge, and the Outerbridge Crossing. He unsuccessfully ran for Staten Island Borough President in 1929 and 1933, as well as for city council in 1937.

Personal life
Allen's house in West New Brighton, New York, the Mark W. Allen House, was declared a New York City Designated Landmark by the New York City Landmarks Preservation Commission in 2006.

Death
Allen died in Staten Island Hospital on October 12, 1958. He was buried in the Moravian Cemetery in New Dorp.

References

External links 
 The Political Graveyard
 Mark W. Allen at Find a Grave

1877 births
1958 deaths
People from Fairfax County, Virginia
Politicians from Staten Island
People from West New Brighton, Staten Island
Businesspeople from New York City
American carpenters
20th-century American businesspeople
American construction businesspeople
American chief executives
20th-century American politicians
Democratic Party New York (state) state senators
American Freemasons
Members of the Methodist Episcopal Church
Burials at Moravian Cemetery